AgriDustrial  is the seventh studio album by American rock band Legendary Shack Shakers. Released on April 13, 2010, the album was the only release by the band to feature guitarist Duane Denison as part of the band's line-up.

Composition
In 2008 Duane Denison joined the Legendary Shack Shakers, and the band shifted their sound, with Wilkes calling this new sound "agridustrial", explaining that it is "kind of chunky industrial patterns, but give it kind of a rustic feel [...] like the sounds of farm implements, that clanking cacophony of rural industry. Kind of like how Johnny Cash used a train rhythm." Chad Radford of Creative Loafing described Agri-Dustrial as "an album that mashes the rhythmic industrial plod of farmland industry with wide-eyed rock and roll". According to Paste magazine, the album incorporates "anvils, hammers and other soul-crushing apparatuses" into its musical composition.

Reception 

Chad Radford of Creative Loafing said that "distorted percussion and layers of ambient noise [...] make Agri Dustrial a masterpiece of experimental music."

Track listing 
 "Melungeon Melody" – 0:34
 "Sin Eater" – 3:13
 "Sugar Baby" – 1:57
 "Nightride (The Ballad of the Black Patch Riders)" – 2:36
 "Dixie Iron Fist" – 2:31
 "Two Tickets to Hell" – 2:57
 "God Fearing People" – 2:56
 "Greasy Creek" – 2:03
 "Hammer and Tongs" – 4:04
 "Hog-Eyed Man" – 1:54
 "Dump Road Yodel" – 2:11
 "Hoboes Are My Heroes" – 3:18
 "Everything I Ever Wanted to Do..." – 2:43
 "The Hills of Hell" – 1:42
 "The Lost Cause" – 2:34
 "Killswitch" – 0:42

Personnel 
 Colonel J.D. Wilkes – vocals, harmonica, banjo, piano, organ, Jew's harp
 Mark Robertson – slap and bowed upright bass, electric bass, guitar, background vocals
 Duane Denison – guitar, "prepared" guitar
 Brett Whitacre – drums and percussion
 Layne Hendrickson;- percussion

References 

2010 albums
Legendary Shack Shakers albums